Warren Kiamco (born May 2, 1970) is a Filipino professional pool player from Cebu, Philippines. He is known for his performances in the Southeast Asian and Asian Games.

Kiamco was a runner-up in three events of the Asian Nine-ball Tour but never a champion.

Warren Kiamco, 38, defeated Efren Reyes, 11–6, and won P 400,000 top cash prize in the First Senate President Manny Villar Cup Billiards Tournament on May 10, 2008, at Muntinlupa.

Titles
 2021 Buffalo's Pro Classic 9-Ball
 2021 Barry Behrman Memorial Open 9-Ball
 2019 CSI U.S Open One-Pocket Championship
 2018 Freezer's Icehouse 10-Ball Challenge
 2018 Andy Mercer Memorial 9-Ball Tournament 
 2017 West Coast 9 Ball Pro Challenge
 2015 Southeast Asian Games Nine-ball Doubles
 2015 Derby City Classic 9-Ball
 2014 Steinway Classic 10-Ball
 2013 Texas Open 9-Ball Championship
 2012 Japan Open 10-Ball
 2012 Johnny Archer Classic 
 2012 Houston Open 9-Ball
 2011 CSI US Bar Table 9-Ball Championship 
 2011 CSI US Bar Table All-Around Title
 2008 Manny Villar Cup Billiards Tournament
 2007 CSI US Bar Table 9-Ball Championship 
 2007 CSI US Bar Table 8-Ball Championship
 2007 CSI US Bar Table All-Around Title
 2007 Blaze Nine-ball Tour Stop
 2005 Kansai 9-Ball Open
 2003 Southeast Asian Games Nine-ball Doubles
 2001 Southeast Asian Games Rotation Singles
 2000 Tokyo 9-Ball Championship
 1999 Asian 9-Ball Championship
 1999 Southeast Asian Games Rotation Doubles
 1999 Canadian Championship
 1995 Andy Mercer Memorial 9-Ball

References

Filipino pool players
Sportspeople from Cebu
Living people
Place of birth missing (living people)
Asian Games medalists in cue sports
Cue sports players at the 2010 Asian Games
Cue sports players at the 2002 Asian Games
1970 births
Asian Games silver medalists for the Philippines
Medalists at the 2002 Asian Games
Medalists at the 2010 Asian Games
Southeast Asian Games gold medalists for the Philippines
Southeast Asian Games bronze medalists for the Philippines
Southeast Asian Games medalists in cue sports
Competitors at the 2017 Southeast Asian Games
Competitors at the 2015 Southeast Asian Games
Competitors at the 2019 Southeast Asian Games
Southeast Asian Games silver medalists for the Philippines